Conny Granqvist (born 30 March 1947) is a former Swedish footballer and manager. A forward, made 133 Allsvenskan appearances for Djurgårdens IF and scored 21 goals.

Honours
Djurgårdens IF
 Allsvenskan: 1966

References

Living people
1947 births
Association football forwards
Swedish footballers
Allsvenskan players
Djurgårdens IF Fotboll players
Swedish football managers
IK Brage managers